Patrik Lundh (born June 12, 1988) is a Swedish professional ice hockey centre who currently plays for Färjestad BK of the Swedish Hockey League (SHL).

Playing career
Lundh began his professional career with Djurgårdens IF in the SHL before moving on to play with  Färjestad BK and Växjö Lakers, claiming a SHL championship with each club before returning to Djurgården.

On May 2, 2018, Lundh left Sweden for the first time in his career and signed a one-year contract with Chinese outfit, Kunlun Red Star of the Kontinental Hockey League (KHL).

After concluding his contract with Kunlun, Lundh returned to Sweden having completed one year in the KHL to sign an optional two-year contract with Linköpings HC of the SHL on 17 July 2019.

Awards and honours

References

External links

1988 births
Living people
Almtuna IS players
Bofors IK players
Djurgårdens IF Hockey players
Färjestad BK players
HC Kunlun Red Star players
Malmö Redhawks players
Schwenninger Wild Wings players
Växjö Lakers players
Swedish ice hockey centres
Ice hockey people from Stockholm